Marshfield Municipal Airport may refer to:

 Marshfield Municipal Airport (Massachusetts) in Marshfield, Massachusetts, United States (FAA: GHG)
 Marshfield Municipal Airport (Wisconsin) in Marshfield, Wisconsin, United States (FAA: MFI)